Mignon è partita (literally Mignon Has Left, internationally released as Mignon Has Come to Stay) is a 1988 Italian drama film directed by  Francesca Archibugi. The film  won five David di Donatello awards for Best New Director, Best Screenplay, Best Actress (Stefania Sandrelli), Best Supporting Actor (Massimo Dapporto) and Best Sound.

The film centers on a sophisticated young Parisian girl who is forced to move to Rome to live with her extended family after her father runs into criminal charges and her mother has a nervous breakdown.

Cast 
Stefania Sandrelli: Laura 
Jean-Pierre Duriez: Federico
Massimo Dapporto: Aldo 
Micheline Presle: Prof. Girelli 
Céline Beauvallet: Mignon
Leonardo Ruta: Giorgio
Daniele Zaccaria: Tommaso
Francesca Antonelli: Chiara

References

External links

1988 films
Italian drama films
Films set in Rome
Films shot in Rome
Films directed by Francesca Archibugi
1988 directorial debut films
1980s Italian-language films
1980s Italian films